Yi Hwang (Hangul: 이황, Hanja: 李 ?; 10 January 1498 - 10 October 1506) was a Korean Crown Prince as the second son (formally as first son) of  Yeonsangun of Joseon and Deposed Queen Shin of the Geochang Sin clan. He firstly become Heir Successor (원자, 元子) then Crown Prince (왕세자, 王世子) and later was deposed from his position along with his father's abdication and then become deposed crown prince (폐세자, 廢世子).

References

Cites

Books

External links

1498 births
1506 deaths
15th-century Korean people
Korean princes
House of Yi
Royalty and nobility who died as children
Heirs apparent who never acceded